The 2018–19 Pro Basketball League, for sponsorship reasons the EuroMillions Basketball League, season was the 92nd season of the Pro Basketball League (PBL), first tier of basketball in Belgium. The season started on 5 October 2018 and ended 13 June 2019.

Filou Oostende captured its eight consecutive league title after defeating Antwerp Giants in the playoff finals.

Teams
All ten teams from the previous season would return this season. Nine teams got A-licences, which allows for participation in European competitions, while Leuven Bears received a B-licence and therefore could not play in Europe.

Kangoeroes Willebroek moved from Willebroek to the city of Mechelen and changed its name into Kangoeroes Mechelen. BC Oostende changed its name to Filou Oostende for sponsorship reasons.

Arenas and locations

Regular season

Standings

Results

Play-offs
Quarterfinals and semifinals were played in a best-of-three games format, while the finals in a best-of-five (1-1-1-1-1) format.

Bracket

Quarterfinals
The team with the higher seed played game one and three (if necessary) at home.

|}

Semifinals
The team with the higher seed played game one, two and 5 (if necessary) at home.

|}

Finals
The team with the higher seed played game one, three and five (if necessary) at home.

|}

Final standings

Belgian clubs in European competitions

References

Basketball League Belgium Division I seasons
Belgian
Lea